The Lee Creek Bridge is a historic bridge across Lee Creek in Van Buren, Arkansas. Now closed to traffic, it is a three-span truss bridge located west of Rena Road on the city's west side. The bridge's single Pratt through truss was built in 1898, and a pair of Warren pony trusses were erected in 1930 to replace a second Pratt truss. The trusses rest on original stone piers. The bridge was bypassed and closed in 1995.

The bridge was listed on the National Register of Historic Places in 2010.

See also
Lee Creek Bridge (Natural Dam, Arkansas)
National Register of Historic Places listings in Crawford County, Arkansas
List of bridges on the National Register of Historic Places in Arkansas

References

Road bridges on the National Register of Historic Places in Arkansas
Bridges completed in 1898
Buildings and structures in Van Buren, Arkansas
National Register of Historic Places in Crawford County, Arkansas
Transportation in Crawford County, Arkansas
Pratt truss bridges in the United States
Metal bridges in the United States
Warren truss bridges in the United States
1898 establishments in Arkansas